The University of Yaoundé I (French: Université de Yaoundé I) is a public university in Cameroon, located in the capital Yaoundé. It was formed in 1993 following a university reform that split the country's oldest university, the University of Yaoundé, into two separate entities: the University of Yaoundé I and the University of Yaoundé II.

The University of Yaounde I, consists of:

 the Faculty of Arts, Humanities and Social Sciences (Faculté des Arts, Lettres et Sciences Humaines, short FALSH)
 the Faculty of Sciences (Faculté des Sciences, short FS)
 the Faculty of Medicine and Biomedical Sciences (Faculté de Médecine et de Sciences Biomédicales, short FMSB).
 The higher teacher's Training College of Yaounde HTTC
 The National Advanced School of Engineering 
 The Higher Teacher's Training Technical School of Ebolowa.

The main university complex is Ngoa-Ekelle with several satellite campuses elsewhere.

References

Yaounde I
Educational institutions established in 1993
1993 establishments in Cameroon